Vlad Holiday (born May 24, 1989) is a New York City–based, Romanian-born singer, songwriter, producer, and multi-instrumentalist. On July 28, 2017, Nylon premiered Holiday's solo project debut "Quit Playing Cool". The song was also featured on Spotify's New Indie Mix playlist, as well as All Genres Hot Tracks on iTunes and Apple Music.

Early life
Holiday was born in Bucharest, Romania on May 24, 1989. Holiday's father was a journalist who spoke out against the regime change in Romania once the country escaped communism in 1989, citing that the new regime was just as corrupt. This resulted in their family receiving death threats, which led to Holiday's father escaping to America with political asylum. It took the rest of the family 9 years to legally move to the US, and in September 1999, Holiday (age 10) moved to Bergen County, New Jersey. He grew up in Mahwah, New Jersey, where he attended Mahwah High School.

Career

Solo career (2017–present)
With a downtown NYC lo-fi sound, writing and recording at his studio in the heart of historic Greenwich Village, Holiday started putting out songs as they are being written, not worrying about the pressures of albums or EP's or any other music industry constructs. On July 28, 2017, Vlad Holiday announced his solo project through Nylon. NYLON premiered his debut track, "Quit Playing Cool". The song was also featured on Spotify's "New Indie Mix" playlist, "Fresh Finds: Six Strings" playlist, as well as featured on All Genres Hot Tracks on iTunes and Apple Music. Quit Playing Cool's music video was released on VEVO's New Alternative playlist on September 1, 2017. The video features model and actress, Yulia Kirillova, and is directed by Polly Pierce.

On March 9, 2018, Holiday put out his second single "Children". The song was featured on Spotify's New Indie Mix playlist, as well as The Wild Honey Pie's "Buzzing Daily" and a Paste Magazine & Daytrotter Live Session.

On April 6, 2018, "Tunnel Vision" premiered on The 405, where he spoke about the song's lyrics, which questions the idea of extreme escapism. “Don't get me wrong, I love escaping from it all every now and then as much as anyone else, but at the end of the day you kinda have to snap back and face the world. There's a whirlpool of social movements happening right now that are actually changing the status quo, which would never have happened if everyone just sat back and waited for everything to resolve itself,” Holiday explains. Holiday held a single release show at Elsewhere Zone One in Brooklyn, NY on April 3, 2018. This third single was also featured on Spotify's New Indie Mix, and True Indie playlists (where Holiday held the cover). Tunnel Vision was played on NYC's Q104.3 WAXQ Out of the Box radio show with Jonathan Clarke, as well as other college radio stations like WSOU.

On May 25, 2018, Holiday released his fourth song, "Obscurity" around a headliner show in Brooklyn, NY at C'mon Everybody.

"Like in the Movies" premiered through MILK on August 24, 2018. The song was also featured on Spotify's New Music Friday and New Indie Mix playlists the day it came out.

On November 30, 2018, Holiday released his final single of the year "Artificial Paradise," as he went on tour opening for Haerts. The song was featured on Spotify's All New Indie playlist among others, and was accompanied by a music video shot by Cara Marceante.

Credits

References

External links

1989 births
Living people
Mahwah High School alumni
Romanian emigrants to the United States
Musicians from New Jersey
Musicians from New York City
People from Mahwah, New Jersey